Chen Chih-Mai (1908–1978) was a Republic of China diplomat who served as ambassador to several countries. After graduating from Tsinghua University in 1928, he pursued further studies in the United States, ultimately receiving a Ph.D. from Columbia University in 1933. After returning to China, he taught at Tsinghua University, Peking University, Nankai University and several other universities. He served in the Ministry of Education and in the Executive Yuan during the war, and in 1944 was transferred to the Embassy of the Republic of China in the United States. In 1955, he became the Chinese Ambassador to the Philippines followed by posts as Chinese Ambassador to Australia (1959–66) and Chinese Ambassador to New Zealand from 1961 to 1966 before becoming Chinese ambassador to Japan (1966–69) and Chinese Ambassador to the Holy See (1969-1978) and Chinese ambassador to Malta (1971-78). He wrote about Chinese art, culture, and politics, delivered the 20th George Ernest Morrison Lecture in Ethnology in 1960, and published in the Journal of the Oriental Society of Australia.

References

1908 births
1978 deaths
Chinese diplomats
Tsinghua University alumni
Columbia University alumni